Polymnia canadensis, commonly known as whiteflower leafcup, is a flowering perennial plant in the family Asteraceae. It is native to eastern North America from Ontario south to Alabama and from Kansas, Oklahoma, and Minnesota east to North Carolina, Vermont and Connecticut. It is considered endangered in the last two states. It is typically found in moist forests over calcareous rocks.

Description
Polymnia canadensis, commonly known as "bears foot" or "small-flowered leafcup", is more easily identified by features other than the small flowers which are present only in the late summer. Often it grows in stands of several plants clustered together. The leaves vary in shape from deeply lobed leaves at the lower part of the plant to the simple leaves at the upper part of the plant (see photo). The sap is clear, sticky and pleasantly fragrant.

References

External links
photo of herbarium specimen at Missouri Botanical Garden, collected in Missouri in 1993

Asteroideae
Flora of North America
Plants described in 1753
Taxa named by Carl Linnaeus